Over the years, there have been many philosophers, writers and other literary figures who have contributed to the Dvaita school of thought, founded by Sri Madhvacharya.

Madhvacharya 
For a complete list, see Works of Madhvacharya

 Anu Bhashya
 Mahabharata Tatparya Nirnaya
 Gita Bhashya
 Brahma Sutra Bhashya

Padmanabha Tirtha 
 Sanyaya Ratnavali
 Sat-tarka-Deepavali
 Commentories on 10 Prakaranas
 Commentory on Gita Bhashya
 Madhwashtaka
 Also believed to have written a marvellous work of 1100 verses called "Vayuleelavistarana"

Vadiraja Theertha 
 Rukminishavijaya
 Yukti Mallika
 Mahabharata Prasthana which includes two important works 1) Mahabharata Lakshalamkara and 2) Commentary on Mahabharata Tatparya Nirnaya of Madhvacarya
 Svapna Vrundavanakhyana
 Gurvartha Dipika a sub-commentary on Sri Jayatirtha's Nyaya Sudha & Tatva Prakashika
 Dashavatara Stuti
 Krishna Stuti
 Hayagriva Sampada Stotra
 Nava Graha Stotra
 Thirtha prabandha

Narayana Panditacharya 
 Sri Madhva Vijaya
 Sangraha Ramayana
 Prameya Nava Malika
 Shiva Stuti
 Narasimha Stuti

Trivikrama Panditacharya 
 Vayu Stuti
 Tattva Dipika
 Vishnu Stuti
 Tatvapradeepa (Commentory on Acharya Madhva's Brahma-sutra-Bhashya)

Jayatirtha 

For a complete list, see Works of Jayatirtha

 Nyaya Sudha
 Tattva Prakashika
 Prameya Deepika
 Nyaya Deepika

Vyasatirtha 
 Nyayamritam
 Tarkatandava
 Tatparya Chandrika
 Mayavada Khandana Mandaramanjari
 Upadhi Khandana Mandaramanjari
 Prapancha Mithyatvanumana Khandana Mandaramanjari
 Tattvaviveka Mandaramanjari
 Bhedojjivana
 Sattarkavilasa

Sripadaraja 
 Vagvajra(A commentary on Jayatirtha's Nyaya Sudha)
 Bhramaragita
 Venugita
 Gopigita

Vijayeendra Tirtha 

 Adhikaranamala
 Adwaitha Shiksha
 AitarEyopanishad bhashya Vyakya
 Ananda taratamya vadarthah
 Anubhashya Tippani
 Anuvyakyana Tippani
 Appayya kapolachapetika
 Brahmasootra Nyayasangraha
 Bruhadaranyopanishad bhashya vyakya
 Bheda vidyavilasah
 Bheda Prabha
 Bheda Sanjeevini
 Bhedaagama Sudakara
 Bheda chintamani (Bhedakalpataru)
 Bheda kusumanjali
 Bhedaprabha (Bhedarathnaprabha)
 Bhuttoji Kuttanam
 Chakra meemamsa
 Chandrikodahrutha Nyayavivaranam
 Chandogyopanishad bhashya vyakya
 Dwasuparnam ityaadinam Bedaparatva samarthanam
 Eashavasyopanishad bhashya Teeka Tippani
 Geeksharaartha:
 Geetabhashya prameyadeepika vyakya
 Geethatatparya nyaayadeepika vyakyanam
 Kathalakshana teeka vyakhya
 Karma Nirnaya Teeka Tippani
 KaTakopanishad bhashya Vyakya
 Kenopanishad bhashya Teeka
 Kuchodya kutharah
 Lingamoolanveshana khandanam
 Madhwadhwa kantakoddharah
 Madhwa siddhantha sarodharah
 Mandookopanishad bhashya vyakya
 Mayavada Kandana Teeka Tippani
 Meemasa nyaaya koumudee
 Mityatvanumanu Kandana Teeka Tippani
 Mundakopanishat Bhashya Vyakya
 Narasimha stutih
 Narayana shabdartha Nirvachanam
 Nyayadeepika tippani
 Nyayavivarana tippani
 Nyaayamrutha Gurvamoda
 Nyaayadhwa Deepika
 Nyaayamrutha Nyayarathnamala
 Nyaayamruta Madhyamamodha
 Nyayamrutaamoda
 Nyaaya moukthikamala
 Nyayamala (Chandrikavyakhya)
 Nyaya champakamala
 Nyayamruthodahruitha Jaimineeya Nyayamala
 Nyayasudha vyaakyaa bindu:
 Nyayamukurah
 Nayanamanjaree
 Omkara vaadaartha
 Paapavimochana stotram (Duritapahara stotra)
 Padartha sangrahah
 Pancha sanskara deepika
 Parameyadeepika tippani
 Paratattva prakashika
 Pramana paddhathi vyakhya
 Pramana lakshana teeka vyakhya
 Pranava darpana khandanam
 Pishtapashu Meemamsa
 Panchasamskara deepika
 Ramanuja matha reethya Sootrartah
 Rugbhashya Tippani
 Sarva siddhantha saraasaara vivekah
 Sanmarga deepika
 Shruthi taatparya Koumudee
 Shruti Tatva prakashika
 Shruthyartha saara:
 Shaivasarvasva khandanam
 Siddhantha saraasara vivechanam
 Shatprashnopanishad bhashya Teeka Tippani
 Sripadarajashtakam
 Shravana Vidhivilaasa:
 Sri Vyasaraja Stotram
 Subhadra Dhananjayah (Kavya)
 Sootraartha sangraha
 Taittareeyopanishad bhashya Teeka
 Tattvamanikya petika (Tattvaprakashika tippani)
 Tureeya Shivakhandanam
 Tattvasankhyana teekavyakhya
 Tattvodyotha goodhabhava prakashah
 Tatparya Chandrika Vyakya
 Tatparya Chandrika bhooshanam
 Tatparya Chandrika Kuchodya KuTara
 Upasamhara vijayah
 Ubhayagrasta Rahoodayah (Play)
 Upadhikandana Teeka Tippani
 Vaadamalika
 Vagvaikharee
 Virodhoddharah
 Vishnu Stuti Vyakyana
 Vishnu tattva nirnaya teeka
 Vyasaraja vijayah ( Kavyaa)
 Yukti ratnakara (tarkatandava vyakya)

Raghuttama Tirtha
Viṣṇutattvanirṇayaṭikā Bhavabodha
Tattvaprakāśikā Bhavabodha
Nyāyavivaranaṭikā Bhavabodha
Nyāyaratna-Sambandhadipikā
Bṛhadāraṇyakopaniṣad Bhasya Bhavabodha
Vivaraṇoddharā Bhavabodha
Gītābhāṣya Prameyadīpikā Bhavabodha
Sanyayavivruthi Bhavabodha
Anuvyakyana Nyāyamāla Brahma Sutra Sambandhapradīpā
Tāratamya Stotram
Taittirīya Vinirnaya

Raghavendra Tirtha 
 Dasha Prakaranas
 Nyaya Muktavali
 Tantra Dipika
 Nyayasudhaa Parimala
 Mantrartha Manjari
 Prameya Dipika
 Gita Vivrutti
 Pratahsankalpa Gadya

Satyanatha Tirtha
Abhinava Chandrika
Abhinavamrutha
Abhinava Tarkatandava
Abhinava Gada
Nyaya Sudha Parashu

Purandara Dasa 
 Thousands of Devaranamas (devotional songs)

Kanaka Dasa 
 Nala Charitre
 Hari Bhakti Sara
 Rama Dhanya Charitre
 Mohana Tarangini

Satyapriya Tirtha
Mahābhāṣya Vivarana
Chandrika Bindu

Satyadharma Tirtha
Tattvasaṁkhyāna Tippani
Namaka Chamaka Vyakhyana
Shreemadbhagavata Tippani
Viratparva Tippani
Udyoga Parva Tippani
Ramayana Tippani
Virahimodasudhavyakhyan
Vishnutatvanirnaya Teeka tippani

Satyadhyana Tirtha
Gitasarasangraha
Gitapradhipadarthachadrika
Bheda Paranyeva Khalu Brahma Sutrani
Chandrikamandanam
Gita Vimarsha
Brahma Sutra Vimarsha
Advaita Branti Prakasha
Gita Lekhana Mala
Bhasma Dharana Nisheda tathaa Urdvapundra Dharanam
Sudarshana Mahatmya
Sabhasara Sangraha Part I (civil suit), II and III (Kannada)
Geethopanyasagalu (Kannada)

Important references for Dvaita philosophy 
 Vedas
 Bhagavata
 Upanishads
 Pancharatra
 Mahabharata
 Ramayana
 Brahma Sutras

See also
 Dvaita

References 
 Kanaka Dasa
 Sree Vadiraja Theertharu
 Sri Vadiraja Tirtha - a short sketch
 Introduction to Bannanje Govindacharya
 Ranga Vittala
 Sri Raghavendra Swami's works

Dvaita Vedanta